The 1983 British motorcycle Grand Prix was the tenth round of the 1983 Grand Prix motorcycle racing season. It took place on the weekend of 29–31 July 1983 at the Silverstone Circuit.

The race was split into two races.  Entering Stowe Corner on Lap 5, Norman Brown's Suzuki slowed with a mechanical problem.  The motorcycle stayed to the inside, but was hit by Peter Huber's Suzuki.  It was not until the end of Lap 5 that riders began to enter pit lane, as only a yellow and an oil flag was displayed, but not fully across the track.  On Lap 6, officials ended up waving the red flag at the starting line.  Brown died instantly, while Huber was rushed by helicopter to a hospital in Oxford, where he was pronounced dead.

The race restarted as a split race.  The first five completed laps were scored, and the remaining 23 laps were completed shortly after the track was cleared.  The total time of the two races combined formed the aggregate time for the results.

Classification

500 cc

References

British motorcycle Grand Prix
British
Motorcycle Grand Prix